Jean-Louis Bodin (23 November 1943 – 3 June 2019) was a French racing cyclist. He rode in the 1965 Tour de France.

References

1943 births
2019 deaths
French male cyclists
Place of birth missing